Guilherme Miguel Torriani (born 6 February 1999) is a Brazilian handball player for Fraikin BM. Granollers and the Brazilian national team.

He participated at the 2017 World Men's Handball Championship. He competed at the 2020 Summer Olympics.

Club Titles
2022 South and Central American Men's Club Handball Championship

Individual awards and achievements

2015 Pan American Men's Youth Handball Championship: Top Scorer
2017 Pan American Men's Youth Handball Championship: Top Scorer and All Star Team Left Wing
2019 South and Central American Men's Junior Handball Championship: Top Scorer

References

External links

1999 births
Living people
Brazilian male handball players
Handball players at the 2020 Summer Olympics
21st-century Brazilian people